Edgar Thomas Snowden Appleyard (14 June 1904 – 15 June 1939) was a physicist and pioneer in the fields of thin films and superconductivity.

Biography
He was born on 14 June 1904, the son of Edgar Snowden Appleyard and Elizabeth Whitehead of Huddersfield, England.

Appleyard attended Almondbury Grammar School and then was admitted to the Cambridge as a King’s College scholar. In the Natural Science Tripos he selected Physics as one of the key science subjects to focus his interest. He spent several years on research in the Cavendish Laboratory. In 1929 at the University of Bristol's H.H. Wills Physics  Laboratory, Appleyard received an appointment to a George Wills research associateship. At the University of Chicago for the 1931–1932 academic year, Appleyard was awarded with a Rockefeller fellowship.

Appleyard died on 15 June 1939 through injuries caused by a fall.

Noteworthy collaborators
H. W. B. Skinner
John J. Hopfield
A.C.B. Lovell
A. D. Misener
Heinz London

Research interests
Excitation of polarized light
Preparation of Schumann plates
Thin metal films: Conductivity, Resistance
Superconductivity

Select publications

Appleyard, E. T. S. "Electronic Structure of the a-X Band System of N2." Physical Review 41.2 (1932): 254.

Appleyard, E. T. S. "Discussion of the papers by Finch, Appleyard and Lennard-Jones." Proceedings of the Physical Society 49.4S (1937): 151.

References

1904 births
1939 deaths
Alumni of King's College, Cambridge
Cavendish Laboratory
People associated with the University of Bristol
University of Chicago fellows
English physicists
Superconductivity
Accidental deaths from falls